The elections held in India in 2019 includes the general election, by-elections to the Lok Sabha, elections to seven state legislative assemblies and numerous other by-elections to state legislative assemblies, councils and local bodies.

General Elections

General elections were held in India in April to May 2019 to constitute the 17th Lok Sabha. The BJP-led NDA won the elections.

The phase-wise schedule, the number of seats in each phase and their State-wise break-up:

Phase 1, 11 April
91 seats, 20 states

A.P. (all 25), Arunachal Pradesh (2), Assam (5), Bihar (4), Chhattisgarh (1) J&K (2), Maharashtra (7), Manipur (1), Meghalaya (2), Mizoram (1), Nagaland (1), Odisha (4), Sikkim (1), Telangana (17), Tripura (1), U.P. (8), Uttarakhand (5), W.B. (2), Andaman and Nicobar Islands (1), Lakshadweep (1)

Phase 2, 18 April
97 seats, 13 states

Assam (5), Bihar (5), Chhattisgarh (3), J&K (2), Karnataka (14) Maharashtra (10), Manipur (1), Odisha (5), Tamil Nadu. (all 39), Tripura (1), U.P. (8), West Bengal (3), Puducherry (1)

Phase 3, 23 April
115 seats, 14 states

Assam (4), Bihar (5), Chhattisgarh (7), Gujarat (all 26), Goa (all 2), J&K (1), Karnataka (14), Kerala (all 20), Maharashtra (14), Odisha (6), U.P. (10), West Bengal (5), Dadra and Nagar Haveli (1), Daman and Diu (1)

Phase 4, 29 April
71 seats, 9 states

Bihar (5), J&K (1), Jharkhand (3), M.P. (6), Maharashtra (17), Odisha (6), Rajasthan (13), U.P. (13), West Bengal (8)

Phase 5, 6 May
51 seats, 7 states

Bihar (5), Jharkhand (4), J&K (2), M.P. (7), Rajasthan (12), U.P. (14), West Bengal (7)

Phase 6, 12 May
59 seats, 7 states

Bihar (8), Haryana (10), Jharkhand (4), M.P. (8), U.P. (14), West Bengal (8), NCR (all 7)

Phase 7, 19 May
59 seats, 8 states

Bihar (8), Jharkhand (3), M.P. (8), Punjab (all 13), West Bengal (9), Chandigarh (1), U.P. (13), Himachal Pradesh (all 4)

Date of counting: May 23

Parliamentary By-election

Legislative assembly elections 

Assembly elections of Andhra Pradesh, Arunachal Pradesh, Odisha, Sikkim, were held simultaneously with the general elections

Legislative assembly elections of Haryana, Maharashtra held on 21 October 2019.

Legislative assembly elections of Jharkhand were held between 30 November to 20 December.

Assembly By-elections

Arunachal Pradesh

Assam

Bihar

Chhattisgarh

Gujarat

Goa

Haryana

Himachal Pradesh

Karnataka

Kerala

Madhya Pradesh

Meghalaya

Mizoram

Nagaland

Odisha

Puducherry

Punjab

Rajasthan

Sikkim

Tamil Nadu

Telangana

Tripura

Uttar Pradesh

Uttarakhand

West Bengal

See also
 2019 Indian Rajya Sabha elections
2020 elections in India
 2018 elections in India

References

External links

 Election Commission of India
Lok Sabha General Election 2019schedules, results and updates 
Legislative Assembly Result | Live Updates 
Lok Sabha General Election 2019 - Parliamentary Polls 2019 Latest News & Updates

 
Elections in India by year